Vulcan is a fictional character that appears in comic books published by DC Comics. He is the second character to star in a book titled Son of Vulcan, the first being Johnny Mann, who was created by Charlton Comics in 1965 and later purchased by DC Comics in 1983.

In the modern version, Miguel Devante is known simply as Vulcan and first appears in Son of Vulcan vol. 2 #1 (August 2005). He was created by Scott Beatty and Keron Grant.

Fictional character biography
Long ago the White Martians created a metavirus, a metagene that could be passed from host to host via touch. This metavirus was responsible for the empowerment of the very first Son of Vulcan. From that time on the Vulcans passed the metavirus down in an unbroken line, sworn to hunt and kill White Martians.

Vulcan
Orphan Miguel "Mikey" Devante, 14, is taken hostage by Jason Woodrue a.k.a. the Floronic Man at the Big Belly Burger in Miguel's hometown of Charlton’s Point. A relatively unknown hero named Vulcan tells Mikey to free the other hostages while he battles the Floronic Man. Miguel stays back after freeing the other hostages to ensure Vulcan is safe. Miguel saves Vulcan from danger by chopping off Floronic Man's arm with Vulcan's sword. Vulcan chooses Miguel to be his successor and takes him from the Derby Youth Home orphanage to his base the Vulcan’s Forge.

Son of Vulcan
Before Miguel can be trained, Praetor, the computer for the Vulcan’s Forge, informs Vulcan that Floronic Man has escaped from custody. Vulcan and his new sidekick, Miguel, go to put Floronic Man back in custody. Miguel quickly realizes that they are not fighting the real Floronic Man for he has two arms and not one. Vulcan is killed by a female White Martian named A'Morr who was disguised as Floronic Man, but not before the Flame of Vulcan is passed on to Mikey.

Miguel returns to Vulcan's Forge, where Praetor asks him to verify himself. Pandora, an android assistant of Vulcan's, learns that Vulcan has been killed, and she goes to retrieve the sword and helmet which were left behind in Miguel's hasty retreat. Praetor, upon Mikey's failure to recite any of the five governing laws of the Line of Fire and thus vox-confirm his identity as Vulcan, begins to scuttle the Forge and ejects Miguel into space, in compliance with Forge security protocols. Pandora saves Miguel and they try to leave the Forge in a jumpjet, the Justi-Flyer. Praetor turns Pandora off but Mikey escapes with the deactivated Pandora.

Rogues Gallery

At the funeral for Vulcan, his "old" enemies, the Coalition of Crime (Witchazel, Dino-Mite, Monkey-in-the-Middle, Charliehorse, Little B.U.D.D.Y., Flex, Scramjet, and Fishmonger, all characters created for the new series), attack Miguel, who is helped by an old Son of Vulcan named Barney Blaine. From Blaine, Miguel learns that the White Martians created the Sons of Vulcan with a metavirus. 

Miguel is captured by a male White Martian named A'monn A'mokk but frees himself and destroys A'morr, but the human-Martian hybrid children of A'monn and A'morr, Sapling, Buster, Silhouette, Quaker and Blur escape. Blur is an albino teenager wearing an altered form of the Reverse-Flash's costume, and he and his four siblings still retain a latent fear of fire. Funky Flashman, who was a member of the first Secret Society of Super-Villains and who provided the White Martians with metahuman genes, never revealed whether or not Blur's human DNA came from Barry Allen or Professor Zoom. Sapling resembled Poison Ivy in powers and costume, and Buster seemed like the character Blockbuster (or maybe a cross between Bizarro and Solomon Grundy). Silhouette seemed to be wearing a variant of Nightshade's old costume (or perhaps the Shadow Thief's) and had similar powers. Quaker had similar powers to Quakemaster. All of the characters to whom the hybrids bear resemblance were at one time members of the original Secret Society of Super-Villains, as was Funky Flashman, so it's assumed that he got the genetic samples from those villains when they were members of the SSoSV.

Miguel and the restored Pandora later go to San Francisco, where Miguel is seen talking to Beast Boy of the Teen Titans and presenting himself as simply Vulcan.

Vulcan next appeared in Infinite Crisis #6 among of the spell-casters who summon the Spectre at Stonehenge.

"Trial by Fire" aftermath

In the JLA story arc "Trial by Fire", an ancient Martian entity called Fernus takes possession of J'onn J'onzz and seemingly exterminates all remaining members of the White Martian race, though surviving White Martians have been seen since, including Miss Martian and the faux Green Martians in the Martian Manhunter miniseries.

One Year Later

Vulcan recently appeared in JSA Classified #19 (Jan 2007), as an unwilling participant in one of Roulette's metahuman brawls, fighting against Bork of the Power Company. He flees, and later resurfaces as one of the new Titans East team members, under the leadership of Cyborg. His comeback is very short-lived, as the Titans are badly injured by Trigon, and Vulcan is left comatose.

The New 52
Vulcan is seen pursuing El Diablo in the pages of Suicide Squad as the latter escapes in a commandeered ambulance to Gotham before his Justi-Flyer is disabled by a shot from Deadshot.

Powers, abilities, and equipment
Thanks to the unique Vulcan Metavirus, Miguel is able to generate intense heat from any part of his body. Miguel wears a special suit of body armor created by previous Vulcans, with gauntlets capable of generating forcefields. All Vulcans carry a special sword with a translucent monomolecular blade that can apparently cut through almost anything.

The Vulcans and Sons of Vulcan had access to the Encyclopedae Vulcanis, the collected lore of everyone who had ever borne the mantle of Vulcan.

References
 Comicon Interview with Scott Beatty

Comics characters introduced in 2005
DC Comics male superheroes
DC Comics metahumans
DC Comics orphans
Fictional characters with fire or heat abilities
Fictional swordfighters in comics
Classical mythology in DC Comics